A Phosphide chloride is a mixed anion compound containing both phosphide (P3−) and chloride (Cl−) ions.

A common structural element is P73− which is called heptaphosphanortricyclane with a formal IUPAC name of heptaphosphatricyclo[2.2.1.02,6]heptane.

Group 12 elements, cadmium and mercury are in most of the known compounds.

List

References

Chlorides
Mixed anion compounds
Phosphides